Shoals are a coastal landform.

Shoals may also refer to:

Places 
Shoals, Indiana
Shoals, North Carolina
Shoals, West Virginia
Shoals Township, Surry County, North Carolina
The Shoals, the Florence–Muscle Shoals metropolitan area in Alabama

Other 
Shoals (album), a 2022 album by Palace
Shoals (horse)
Shoals High School, a high school in Martin County, Indiana
Shoals Marine Laboratory, a marine field station in Maine

See also 
Bay of Shoals
Bull Shoals (disambiguation)
Isles of Shoals
Shoal (disambiguation)
Muscle Shoals (disambiguation)
Mussel Shoals (disambiguation)